Petrus Hendrik Hugo,  (20 December 1917 – 6 June 1986) was a South African fighter pilot and flying ace in the Royal Air Force (RAF) during the Second World War.

Early life
Petrus Hendrik Hugo was born 20 December 1917 on the farm Pampoenpoort in the Victoria West district, Cape Province. He attended the Witwatersrand College of Aeronautical Engineering and in 1938 he went to the United Kingdom to attend the Civil Flying School at Sywell.

Hugo was awarded a Short Service Commission in the RAF in April 1939. His Afrikaans origins and pronounced accent soon earned him the nickname "Dutch", and he was known by this throughout his RAF career.

Military career
He served at No.13 Flying Training School for six months and was assessed "exceptional" at the end of his course. He attended the Fighter School at RAF St. Athan in Wales, and in December 1939, joined No. 615 Squadron RAF at Vitry, in France, equipped with the Gloster Gladiator.

In April 1940, the squadron re-equipped with Hawker Hurricanes. During the Battle of France, Hugo shot down a Heinkel He 111 bomber on 20 May 1940. 615 Squadron returned to the UK and were stationed at RAF Croydon and RAF Kenley.

On 20 July 1940 Hugo shot down two Messerschmitt Bf 109 fighters and shot down yet another Bf 109 on 25 July. He then shared a Heinkel He 59 floatplane with another pilot on 27 July. On 12 August Hugo shot down another Bf 109. On 16 August he claimed a He 111 probably destroyed over Newhaven, but was himself hit by cannon shell splinters from a Messerschmitt Bf 110. Slightly wounded in both legs, Hugo returned to action two days later. He was "bounced" by Bf 109s of JG 3 and wounded in the left leg, left eye and right cheek and jaw. He managed to crash-land, and was taken to Orpington Hospital. In late August, 1940, the award of the Distinguished Flying Cross (DFC) was announced. By late September he rejoined No. 615, based at Prestwick in Scotland.

In mid 1941 the squadron, now flying the cannon-armed Hurricane IIc, returned to RAF Kenley. On 14 October 1941 Hugo shared a Heinkel He 59 flying boat shot down with three other pilots. He assumed command of 41 Squadron RAF on 20 November, which was flying Supermarine Spitfires, and was awarded a Bar to his DFC on 25 November. On 12 February 1942 during the channel dash of the German battleships Scharnhorst and Gneisenau, he shot down one Bf 109 and damaged a second. On 14 March he shot down another Bf 109 over a German convoy near Fecamp, and on 26 March he claimed another escorting Bostons raiding Le Havre. Promoted to wing commander on 12 April, he took over as Tangmere Wing Leader, but on 27 April was wounded again, being shot down in the English Channel. In a running fight with Focke-Wulf Fw 190s of II./JG 26, he claimed a probable Fw 190 and damaged a second but was hit in the left shoulder, and had to bail out, being picked up by Air Sea Rescue. He was awarded the Distinguished Service Order while recuperating at 11 Group HQ.

In late November he took over No. 322 Wing RAF. On 12 November he combined with Flight Lieutenant Alan Eckford to destroy a Dornier Do 217 near Djidjelli. He claimed a probable Junkers Ju 88 and another damaged near Bougie Harbour on 13 November, and two days later a probable He 111 and a damaged Ju 88 over Bône Harbour. On 16 November he downed a Ju 88 and two Bf 109s. He got another Ju 88 on 18 November and three more Bf 109s on 21, 26 and 28 November. On 2 December he shot down two Italian Breda Ba 88 bombers of 30 gruppo near La Galite, one being shared, and on 14 a Savoia-Marchetti SM.79. He led 322 Wing for the next four months until posted to HQ, North-West African Coastal Air Force, and also awarded a second Bar to the DFC.

He returned to command No. 322 Wing in June 1943 and on 29 June destroyed a Bf 109. On 2 September Hugo shot down a Fw 190 near Mount Etna and on 18 November he got his last confirmed victory of the war, an Arado Ar 196 Floatplane of Seeaufkl. 126, over the Adriatic coast.

His final tally was 17 destroyed, three shared destroyed, three probably destroyed and seven damaged. Of these, 12 and one shared destroyed were scored in the Spitfire V.

Later life and legacy
Petrus Hugo died in 1986. His medals were auctioned for £150,000 in 2010. Hugo Gardens in the London Borough of Havering is named after him.

References
Citations

Bibliography
 Price, Alfred. Spitfire Mark V Aces, 1941–45 Osprey, London. 1997. 

1917 births
1986 deaths
Afrikaner people
Royal Air Force pilots of World War II
Companions of the Distinguished Service Order
Recipients of the Croix de Guerre 1939–1945 (France)
Recipients of the Distinguished Flying Cross (United Kingdom)
Recipients of the Distinguished Flying Cross (United States)
Royal Air Force officers
South African World War II flying aces
The Few
People from Victoria West